Daniel Ritchie McGladdery was a politician in Northern Ireland. He was active in the Amalgamated Engineering Union in Belfast, becoming a shop steward.

He was elected as an Ulster Unionist member of the Senate of Northern Ireland in 1957, and served until the Senate's abolition in 1973.  He was Deputy Leader of the Senate from 1960 until the office was abolished in 1961, and served as Parliamentary Secretary in the Department of the Prime Minister from 1960 to 1970.

References

Ulster Unionist Party members of the Senate of Northern Ireland
Members of the Senate of Northern Ireland 1957–1961
Members of the Senate of Northern Ireland 1961–1965
Members of the Senate of Northern Ireland 1965–1969
Members of the Senate of Northern Ireland 1969–1973
Northern Ireland junior government ministers (Parliament of Northern Ireland)
Year of birth missing
Place of birth missing